Planet Ultra is a studio album by Dutch rap rock band Urban Dance Squad. Released in 1996, the album marked another stylistic change for the band after the hard rock and heavy metal sounds of their previous album Persona Non Grata. Though DJ DNA had not yet returned by this point, the band once again made use of turntables. Band member Rudeboy sings on the album.

Production
The album was produced by the band, with mixing done by Phil Nicolo.

Track listing

 Nonstarter  (4:36)
 Temporarily Expendable  (3:32)
 Forgery  (2:15)
 Planet Ultra  (4:59)
 Dresscode  (5:02)
 Totalled  (2:57)
 Warzone 109  (3:13)
 Metaphore Warfare  (2:48)
 Ego  (2:38)
 Carbon Copy  (3:39)
 Everyday Blitzkrieg  (1:17)
 Inside-Outsider  (2:32)
 Stark Sharks & Backlashes  (3:17)
 Pass The Baton Right  (3:20)
 Damn The Quota  (1:54)
 Grifter Swifter  (6:21)
 Tabloid Say  (15:44)
 Natural Born Communicator  (3:40)

References

External links 

 Urban Dance Squad – Planet Ultra (1996, CD)

1996 albums
Urban Dance Squad albums
Virgin Records albums